Franklin Mountains State Park is a Texas state park in El Paso, Texas, in the United States. It is one of the largest urban parks in the nation lying completely within city limits, covering . Franklin Mountains State Park is open year-round for recreational hiking, mountain biking, picnicking and scenic driving and vistas.

History
Native Americans and other travelers have used the natural resources in the Franklin Mountains when crossing the gap between the Franklin Mountains and the Juarez Mountains that is now Ciudad Juárez across the Rio Grande in Mexico and El Paso. Pictograms and mortar pits confirm a human presence in the mountains dating back more than 12,000 years.

The Franklin Mountains are most likely named after Benjamin Franklin Coons, who in 1849 purchased a ranch in what is now El Paso. At first known as Coons Ranch, by 1851 the settlement took on Coons' middle name and was called Franklin. Despite the town being officially named El Paso in 1852, the locals continued to call it Franklin throughout the 1850s.
 
The El Paso Tin Mining and Smelting Company operated a tin mine on the northeast slope of North Franklin Mountain from 1909 to 1915. While the mine had the distinction of being the only tin mine ever located in the U.S., it was an economic failure.

Efforts to grant protected status to the Franklin Mountains began as early as 1925. A real estate developer sought to build housing on the mountains and in 1979 he built a road up into them. A local organization known as the Wilderness Park Coalition was able to convince the Texas Legislature to protect the mountains in 1979. Despite this success the legislature, in the same bill, prohibited funding for the development, operation and maintenance of the park. The property was formally acquired in 1981. Changes to the legislation were made in 1985 when a plan for park development was established and the park was opened to the public in 1987.

Geology
The Franklins were formed due to crustal extension related to the Cenozoic Rio Grande rift. Although the present topography of the range and adjoining basins is controlled by extension during rifting in the last 10 million years, faults within the range also record deformation during the Laramide orogeny, between 85 and 45 million years ago.

The Precambrian rocks atop North Franklin Mountain are "the highest geological structure in the state of Texas." North Franklin Peak can be accessed via a trail located east of Mundy's Gap. The mountains are composed primarily of sedimentary rock with some igneous intrusions. Geologists refer to them as tilted-block fault mountains and in them can be found billion-year-old Precambrian rocks, the oldest in Texas.

Ecology
Franklin Mountains State Park is part of the Chihuahuan Desert. The plants and wildlife found in the park, despite it being within a city, are typical of those found throughout the rest of the desert. Barrel cactus, yucca, Mexican and California poppies are common plants. Trees like cottonwood, hackberry, juniper and oak grow along the springs on the mountain slopes. Mammals in the park include mule deer, mountain lions, ring-tailed cat and a variety of rodents. Birds observed at the park included golden eagles, owls, hawks, and a wide variety of smaller birds.

Recreation
Franklin Mountains State Park is open for year-round recreation. Development of the park is limited and much of the land is far from paved access roads and parking areas. Two hiking trails can be accessed from Woodrow Bean Transmountain Drive. Rock climbing is permitted in the park and well established climbing areas are located in McKelligon Canyon The park headquarters is also located in McKelligon Canyon. Five camping areas are found in the Tom Mays Unit of the park with picnic facilities.

The Wyler Aerial Tramway is an aerial tramway operated by the Texas Parks and Wildlife Department and is located in the Franklin Mountains State Park. The tram is closed to public as of Sept. 2018. The trip takes about four minutes and lifts riders up 940 vertical feet above the boarding area.

Gallery

See also
Franklin Mountains (Texas)
North Franklin Mountain
Beach Mountains
El Paso, Texas
Wyler Aerial Tramway
Texas Parks and Wildlife Department

References

External links

Public domain photos of West Texas and Llano Estacado 
Home movie of the Franklin Mountains State Park from the Sandoval Family on the Texas Archive of the Moving Image

Protected areas established in 1979
State parks of Texas
Geography of El Paso, Texas
Protected areas of El Paso County, Texas
Tourist attractions in El Paso, Texas